The Community Mortgage Program is a socialized housing initiative of the Philippine Government. By 2001, 106,273 families had found secure tenure.

Program 
The Community Mortgage Program (CMP) was set up following the People Power Revolution (EDSA I) of 1988. It aims to help low-income families who are squatting to find secure tenure by establishing community associations to buy land, to set up infrastructure and to build houses. In 1992, the CMP was taken under the National Shelter Program by Republic Act Number 7279, the Urban Development and Housing Act. Then in 2004, Social Housing Finance Corporation (SHFC) was created through Executive Order Number 272 and the CMP alongside other housing initiatives was moved under its control.

In the 1990s, individual families could get loans to fund housing construction, namely 30,000 pesos for undeveloped land, 45,000 pesos for developed land and 80,000 pesos for a house with lot. The loans were given at 6% interest on a 25-year repayment plan.

Legacy 
The efficiency of the program was challenged by budget cuts and crises in the National Housing Mortgage Finance Corporation. By 2001, the CMP had helped 106,273 families to set up 854 communities.

References 

Law of the Philippines
Public housing in the Philippines
Presidency of Corazon Aquino
Squatting in the Philippines